Yanet Cruz Cruz (born 8 February 1988 in Jiguaní, Granma) is a female javelin thrower and baseball player from Cuba. She won the bronze medal at the 2005 World Youth Championships. She also competed at the 2008 and 2012 Olympic Games without reaching the final round. Her personal best throw is 63.50 metres, achieved in March 2011 in Havana.

Cruz represented her country at the 2015 Pan American Games women's baseball tournament, where the team finished in fifth (and last place).

Personal best
Javelin throw: 63.50 m –  La Habana, 19 March 2011.

Achievements

References

External links

Tilastopaja biography
Ecured biography (in Spanish)

1988 births
Living people
Cuban female javelin throwers
Athletes (track and field) at the 2008 Summer Olympics
Athletes (track and field) at the 2012 Summer Olympics
Athletes (track and field) at the 2011 Pan American Games
Olympic athletes of Cuba
Pan American Games bronze medalists for Cuba
Pan American Games medalists in athletics (track and field)
Medalists at the 2011 Pan American Games
Baseball players at the 2015 Pan American Games
Cuban baseball players
People from Jiguaní
21st-century Cuban women